Vishwavani daily has around 56 years of history, published by Patil Puttappa from Hubballi. Vishweshwar Bhat is the managing director and chief editor of the news paper.  The tag line on its masthead is " Vishwasave Vishwa". Karnataka Chief Minister Siddaramaiah inaugurated the revamped edition on 15 January 2016.

Vishwa Vani is highly admired for its Coloumns written by Thyagaraj, B.Ganapathi, Ravindra Joshi, Srivathsa Joshi and the Editor-in-chief Vishweshwar Bhat himself whose coloumns appear on Thursday and Sunday respectively. Pratap Simha Member of Parliament of Mysuru & Kodagu – who was a journalist himself also writes his weekly coloumn 'Bettale Jagattu' every Saturday. Vishwa Vani extensively covered the death of Centenarian seer Sri Sri Shivakumara Swamiji; even devoting a couple of pages depicting the childhood, education, support of parents and taking Sanyasa in a beautiful informative manner.

The travelogues written by Vishweshwar Bhat in his weekly coloumn and in its supplementary provide the detailed insights of the culture, traditions, people, interesting facts, behaviour of the people, cleanliness, cuisine, books, nature, infrastructure and a range of other issues. The Editor-in-chief Vishweshwar Bhat also answers the queries of his readers. Rohith Chakrateertha is also one of the prominent columnists who has been working since its inauguration.

See also
 List of Kannada-language newspapers
 List of Kannada-language magazines
 List of newspapers in India
 Media in Karnataka
 Media of India

References

External links
 Kannada newspapers list

Newspapers published in Bangalore
Kannada-language newspapers
1960 establishments in Mysore State
Publications established in 1960